Radio Lumière is an Evangelical Christian radio network in Haiti. The headquarters is located in Port-au-Prince.

History
Radio Lumière was founded in December 1958 by Evangelical Baptist Mission of South Haiti in Les Cayes.  It was officially launched in February 1959.

See also
 Media of Haiti

References

External links
 Official Website

Radio stations in Haiti
Radio stations established in 1958